Philip James Joslin (1 September 1916 – 31 January 1980) was an English professional footballer who played as a goalkeeper. He made over 200 appearances in the English Football League for Torquay United and Cardiff City before his career was ended in 1951 due to injury.

Career
Born in Kingsteignton, as a youngster Joslin was rejected by Plymouth Argyle after a trial and instead joined Torquay United in 1936 and was the first choice goalkeeper at the club up until the outbreak of World War II. During the war he served with the Royal Army Service Corps and often played for his division as a centre forward. During the war he also guested for London sides Arsenal, Fulham and Tottenham Hotpsur.

He returned to Torquay following the end of the war before signing for Cardiff City, who had first refusal on Torquay players at the time, in 1948 and kept fifteen clean sheets in thirty-eight league appearances in his first season. He remained the club's first choice for a further two seasons before his career was ended by injury in August 1951. Whilst playing in a pre-season public practice match for the club, he collided with centre-forward Wilf Grant, breaking his leg. Joslin never fully recovered from the injury and did not play professional football again.

References

External links

1916 births
1980 deaths
English footballers
Association football goalkeepers
Torquay United F.C. players
Arsenal F.C. wartime guest players
Fulham F.C. wartime guest players
Cardiff City F.C. players
English Football League players
People from Kingsteignton
British Army personnel of World War II
Royal Army Service Corps soldiers